The Eastern Indiana Conference existed in Northeastern Indiana from 1953 to 1975. It consisted of schools from Adams, Blackford, Delaware, Jay, and Wells Counties. The conference is notable for having two county conferences (Adams and Jay) fold into it, in 1957 and 1967, respectively. However, two years after the Jay County Conference folded into the EIC, the four Jay County schools were the only programs left in the conference.

This conference should not be confused with the Eastern Indiana Athletic Conference, which still exists and is based in southeastern Indiana.

Membership

 Albany played concurrently in the DCC and ACC from 1953 until the school closed in 1968.
 Schools played concurrently in the ACC and EIC from date entered until the county conference folded into the EIC in 1957.
 Schools played concurrently in EIC and JCC until 1967, when conference folded into EIC.
 Lancaster Central played concurrently in the EIC and WCC from 1954 to 1959.

References 

Indiana high school athletic conferences
High school sports conferences and leagues in the United States
Indiana High School Athletic Association disestablished conferences